"Learning to Breathe" is the third single from the re-release of Nerina Pallot's album Fires; overall it is the album's fifth single release. The release date was postponed from New Year's Day 2007 to the following week, and was promoted by performances on such TV programmes as GMTV and BBC 1's The Heaven and Earth Show.

The single entered at #28 on the Official UK Airplay Chart, later peaking at #22. One week later it charted at #70 on the Official UK Singles Chart. Low download sales contributed to this position, as the single entered at #19 on the Official UK Physical CD Chart. "Learning to Breathe" spent just one week inside the Top 75 but several weeks in the Airplay Top 30 during January and February 2007.

The single includes Pallot's cover of Joy Division's "Love Will Tear Us Apart."

Video
The video for "Learning to Breathe" was directed by Lee Lennox.

In the video Pallot is seated playing the guitar and singing at a hall. Behind where she is playing, there are pictures; the camera goes inside of one of them, in which there are various animated characters (some of which are also featured in the album's cover booklet, which Pallot designed herself). The characters sing and play together during the video, then Pallot is seated in a swing tied to a stone, singing and looking at the moon. The video finishes just as it began.

Track listings 
CD, 7" vinyl
"Learning to Breathe" (radio edit)
"Love Will Tear Us Apart"

7" vinyl
"Learning to Breathe"
"Vena Cava"

Australian CD
"Learning to Breathe" (Radio Edit)
"Love Will Tear Us Apart"
"Confide in Me"

2007 singles
Nerina Pallot songs
Songs written by Nerina Pallot
Song recordings produced by Eric Rosse
2007 songs
14th Floor Records singles